Mahendragarh Lok Sabha constituency was a Lok Sabha (parliamentary) constituency in Haryana state in northern India till 2008.

Assembly segments
Mahendragarh Lok Sabha constituency comprised the following Vidhan Sabha (legislative assembly) segments:

Members of Parliament

1952: Hira Singh Chinaria, Indian National Congress (fr P A P E S )
1952: Ram Krishan Gupta, Indian National Congress (fr P A P E S )
1957: Ram Krishan Gupta, Indian National Congress ( fr Punjab State )
1962: Yudvir Singh Chaudhary, Jan Sangh ( fr Punjab State )
1967: Rao Gajraj Singh, Indian National Congress
1971: Rao Birender Singh, Vishal Haryana Party
1977: Manoharlal, Bharatiya Lok Dal 
1980: Rao Birender Singh, Indian National Congress (Indira)
1984: Rao Birender Singh, Indian National Congress
1989: Rao Birender Singh, Janata Dal
1991: Col.(Retd.) Rao Ram Singh, Indian National Congress
1996: Col.(Retd.) Rao Ram Singh, Bharatiya Janata Party
1998: Rao Inderjit Singh, Indian National Congress
1999: Dr. Sudha Yadav, Bharatiya Janata Party
2004: Rao Inderjit Singh, Indian National Congress
For post-2008 results, see Bhiwani-Mahendragarh (Lok Sabha constituency)

See also
 Bhiwani-Mahendragarh (Lok Sabha constituency)
 Mahendragarh district
 List of Constituencies of the Lok Sabha

References

Mahendragarh district
Former Lok Sabha constituencies of Haryana
Former constituencies of the Lok Sabha
2008 disestablishments in India
Constituencies disestablished in 2008